ByteDefender also known as ByteDefender Security 2010 is a scareware rogue malware application on Windows that masquerades as a legitimate antivirus program. It uses a false system scanner that produces large deposits of malware and it attempts to scare the users to purchase the full version of the rogue software for the removal of nonexistent and/or unnecessary spyware items.
The name of this antispyware program is used to confuse the user looking for the legitimate Bitdefender before downloading the software.

Bytedefender Security 2010 may be downloaded as a trojan horse along with possible other antivirus programs. Additionally, ByteDefender comes from WinPC Defender family of rogue antispyware programs.

Features of a Bytedefender website 

The official website of Bytedefender Security 2010 (www.bytedefender.in) is an unauthorised clone of Bitdefender Antivirus 2010 website but have different layouts.
 The top heading of the page looks different from the original website.
 The software's slogan uses Maximum Security Help protect your PC instead of Maximum security, Maximum speed.
 The price of ByteDefender Security 2010 is more expensive than the legitimate Bitdefender.

Symptoms of infection 

 Bytedefender is designed to behave like genuine antispyware softwares but the system scans and messages are false.
 It can immediately create a trojan horse that can affect your system's behavior or it can be a form of a fake online scanner or fake video codec.
 It can add entry in HKCU and HKLM every time you start Windows.
 It will add malicious entries to the registry and system.
 It will generate multiple commercial advertisements stating that the system is infected with spyware and malware. Removal of the threat will force victims to pay for the full rogue version.

Removal 

ByteDefender can be detected and removed with certain antispyware and antivirus programs like SpyHunter, Bitdefender and Malwarebytes.

See also 
 Rogue security software

References 

Rogue software